Reid Scott (born Reid Scott Weiner; November 19, 1977) is an American actor. He is best known for his starring roles as Brendan "Brando" Dorff in the TBS comedy series My Boys (2006–2010) and Deputy Director of Communications Dan Egan in the HBO comedy series Veep (2012–2019). Scott also appeared in the romantic comedy film Home Again (2017), the superhero film Venom (2018), and the comedy-drama film Late Night (2019).

Early life
Scott was born on November 19, 1977, in Albany, New York, the son of Kathleen and Neil Weiner. He attended La Salle Institute in Troy, New York and Syracuse University, graduating in 2000, before moving to New York City to pursue his acting/writing career.

Career
Scott began his career with roles in the off-Broadway play Cargo and several television commercials. In 2002 he won the lead role in the Fox pilot With You in Spirit, for which he received his Screen Actors Guild card. Scott recalls, "I remember thinking that the money from the pilot was a fortune. It wasn't. After renting a car to get around L.A., paying off some debt and maybe buying a new pair of shoes, I was broke. I had to borrow money from my father just to join SAG."

Since then he has appeared in television and film, most notably My Boys, an original series on TBS. He appeared in an episode of Bones, on The Secret Life of the American Teenager as Dr. Jeff Tseguay, as Mike in Motorcity and in CSI: NY as Seth Riggin. Scott joined the cast of Showtime's The Big C in 2010. He played Dr. Todd Mauer, oncologist for the main character (played by Laura Linney). He appeared on the big screen in films such as Amusement and Losing Control.

Scott co-starred as Dan Egan on HBO's political comedy series Veep.

He also voiced Turbo in the Netflix original animated series Turbo FAST. The series is based on the 2013 film Turbo.

In June 2014, it was reported that Scott had joined the Nancy Meyers film The Intern, as a "smooth-talking, cocky young businessman." However, Scott's character is not in the final cut of the film.

In 2020, Scott played the lead role of David in the NBC drama pilot Echo which was written by JJ Bailey. He played a supporting role as Ben in the 2022 drama film Wildflower.

Personal life
On June 21, 2014, Scott married his longtime girlfriend Elspeth Keller. Together they have two sons, Conrad (born March 31, 2015) and Damon (born January 4, 2018).

Filmography

Film

Television

Awards and nominations

References

External links

 

1977 births
Living people
American male television actors
American male film actors
American male voice actors
Syracuse University alumni
Actors from Albany, New York
Male actors from New York (state)
21st-century American male actors